The Royal Canadian Air Force existed from 1924 to 1968, later designated Canadian Forces Air Command under the Canadian Forces, and then renamed to its original historic name of Royal Canadian Air Force in 2011. These are the squadrons that have served with Canada's air force since 1924.

Early squadrons
These early squadron numbers have a history going back to the post-First World War Canadian Air Force which disbanded in 1920. These units were formed after the creation of the RCAF in 1924. 

 No. 1 Squadron RCAF
 No. 2 Squadron RCAF
 No. 3 Squadron RCAF
 No. 4 Squadron RCAF
 No. 5 Squadron RCAF
 No. 6 Squadron RCAF
 No. 7 Squadron RCAF
 No. 8 Squadron RCAF
 No. 9 Squadron RCAF
 No. 10 Squadron RCAF
 No. 11 Squadron RCAF
 No. 12 Squadron RCAF
 No. 13 Squadron RCAF
 No. 14 Squadron RCAF
 No. 18 Squadron RCAF

100-series squadrons
Established in Canada in the 1930s most of these units were either disbanded or reassigned a 400 series number for overseas service. 

 No. 110 Squadron RCAF
 No. 111 Squadron RCAF
 No. 112 Squadron RCAF
 No. 113 Squadron RCAF
 No. 114 Squadron RCAF
 No. 115 Squadron RCAF
 No. 116 Squadron RCAF
 No. 117 Squadron RCAF
 No. 118 Squadron RCAF
 No. 119 Squadron RCAF
 No. 120 Squadron RCAF
 No. 121 Squadron RCAF
 No. 122 Squadron RCAF
 No. 123 Squadron RCAF
 No. 124 Squadron RCAF
 No. 125 Squadron RCAF
 No. 126 Squadron RCAF
 No. 127 Squadron RCAF
 No. 128 Squadron RCAF
 No. 129 Squadron RCAF
 No. 130 Squadron RCAF
 No. 131 Squadron RCAF
 No. 132 Squadron RCAF
 No. 133 Squadron RCAF
 No. 134 Squadron RCAF
 No. 135 Squadron RCAF
 No. 145 Squadron RCAF
 No. 147 Squadron RCAF
 No. 149 Squadron RCAF
 No. 160 Squadron RCAF
 No. 161 Squadron RCAF
 No. 162 Squadron RCAF
 No. 163 Squadron RCAF
 No. 164 Squadron RCAF
 No. 165 Squadron RCAF
 No. 166 Squadron RCAF
 No. 167 Squadron RCAF
 No. 168 Squadron RCAF
 No. 170 Squadron RCAF

400-series squadrons

During the Second World War, the British Commonwealth Air Training Plan (BCATP) set out co-operation between the various British Commonwealth air forces. Under Article XV of the BCATP, RCAF squadrons were attached to and/or formed within British RAF operational formations. These squadrons were known as 'Article XV squadrons'. To avoid confusion with squadron numbers of other Commonwealth nations, RCAF units were assigned squadron numbers from 400–449. Not all squadrons up No. 449 were formed, however. This squadron series continued through the post-war years, and the majority of current Royal Canadian Air Force operational squadrons are still numbered in the 400s due to their legacy as wartime units. For this historical reason current squadrons are listed here with their original RCAF names.

600-series squadrons

During the Second World War pilots who served in the 600-series RCAF squadrons were recruited from the Royal Canadian Artillery in England and Italy, and trained to fly at No. 2 Elementary Flying Training School RAF Cambridge (England), completing their operational flying training at 43 O.T.U. (RAF Andover). Observers were trained at Larkhill (England); these were selected 'Other Ranks' from the Royal Canadian Air Force and Royal Canadian Artillery. The three Canadian 'Air Observation Post' squadrons operated under the command of No. 70 Group RAF, RAF Fighter Command; the first two squadrons saw action while serving with No. 84 Group RAF, RAF Second Tactical Air Force.
 
 No. 664 Squadron RCAF
 No. 665 Squadron RCAF
 No. 666 Squadron RCAF

Post-war squadrons
Subsequent to the Second World War the RCAF expanded their squadron numbers to include 444–450. No. 450 was also a Royal Australian Air Force squadron during the war and the Canadian squadron duplicated the number by error, which was discovered when No. 450 Squadron RCAF was formed in 1968. 
 No. 444 Squadron RCAF
 No. 445 Squadron RCAF
 No. 446 Squadron RCAF
 No. 447 Squadron RCAF
 No. 448 Squadron RCAF
 No. 449 Squadron RCAF
 No. 450 Squadron RCAF

Other squadrons
 21 Aerospace Control and Warning Squadron
 103 Search and Rescue Squadron – This unit was operational in the RCAF from 1947–1968. Initially as 103 Search and Rescue Flight it was renamed as 103 Rescue Unit in 1950 and remained active until 1968.  It was reactivated in 1977 by the Canadian Forces and redesignated a squadron in 1997.
 107 Rescue Unit – formerly a detachment of 103 Search and Rescue Squadron was created in 1954 and remained there until the RCAF left and transferred it back to Transport Canada as civilian airport St. John's International Airport.
 No. 242 (Canadian) Squadron RAF
 10 Squadron or Heavier-than-air Experimental Air Squadron VX 10 – not part of RCAF (or mistaken for No. 10 Squadron RCAF) it was established in 1953 to test and evaluate aircraft for the Royal Canadian Navy within the Royal Canadian Naval Air Station Shearwater. It was disbanded in 1970.

See also

List of Royal Air Force aircraft squadrons
List of Fleet Air Arm aircraft squadrons
List of Army Air Corps aircraft units

References

Squadron information from Juno Beach Centre
Squadron information from Government of Canada
 Fromow, Lt-Col. D.L. (2002)  Canada's Flying Gunners , Air Observation Post Pilot's Association, Ottawa, Canada  
 Stewart, Major A.B. (1945)  Battle History 666 , Epe, Holland

Canadian Air Force squadrons
Canadian Air Force
 
Air Force squadrons